Chakrapani (born Aluri Venkata Subbarao; 5 August 1908 – 24 September 1975) was an Indian film producer, screenwriter, and director known for his works predominantly in Telugu cinema. He won two Filmfare Awards for Telugu films. He was also notable for his association with Vijaya Vauhini Studios, one of the largest studios in Asia at that time. Chakrapani was also a partner of Vijaya Productions along with B. Nagi Reddy and founder of Chandamama children magazine.

Early life
Chakrapani was born in Ithanagar village near Tenali, Guntur, Andhra Pradesh, India, in a middle class agricultural family.

He learnt Hindi under the tutelage of the well-known author Vraj Nandan Sharma. Later, he taught himself Tamil, Sanskrit, and English and soon mastered all three languages.

Literary career

Bengali literature
Chakrapani contracted tuberculosis in 1932 and had to stay at Madanapalle sanatorium for medical treatment. He learned Bengali during that time from another inmate recuperating from the illness. Initially, he started translating novels from Bengali to Telugu like Devdas as Devadasu (1933), Bada Didi. His translations of the novels of Sharat Chandra Chatterji became so popular in Telugu, the readers would not believe that the originals were written in Bengali language.

Film career
He was closely associated with Nagi Reddy, together they formed the Vijaya Vauhini duo. With his creative mind, he started writing short stories and novels in Telugu. He scripted the film Dharmapatni in 1940 for 'Famous Films', Mumbai. Well-known Telugu film producer B. N. Reddy invited him to Chennai to write the script for Swarga Seema. At this time, he came in contact with Nagi Reddy, became a partner and made movies under Vijaya-Vauhini banner. Together, they made successful movies like Patala Bhairavi, Maya Bazar, Gundamma Katha, Missamma, Shavukaru, and Appu Chesi Pappu Koodu that are still popular with Telugu speaking people. Both made 35 films in Telugu, Tamil, Kannada, Odia and Hindi languages.

Awards
National Film Award for Best Feature Film in Kannada – Maduve Madinodu (1965)
Filmfare Best Film Award (Telugu) - Maya Bazaar (1957)
 Filmfare Best Film Award (Telugu) - Gundamma Katha (1962)

Selected filmography
 Dharmapatni (Telugu, 1941) (dialogue) (debut)
 Dharmapatni (Tamil, 1941) (dialogue)
 Swargaseema (1945) (dialogue) (story)
 Shavukaru (1950) (writer)
 Pelli Chesi Choodu (1952) (writer)
 Chandraharam (1954) (writer)
 Guna Sundari (1955) (Producer)
 Missamma (1955) (writer)
 Missiamma (1955) (writer)
 Appu Chesi Pappu Koodu (1958) (adaptation)
 Rechukka Pagatichukka (1959) (screen adaptation)
 Gundamma Katha (1962) (story)
 Manithan Maravillai (1962) (screen adaptation)
 Julie (1975) (screen adaptation)
 Sri Rajeswari Vilas Coffee Club (1976) (writer)
 Swayamvar (1980) (story)

Producer
 Sri Rajeswari Vilas Coffee Club (1976)
 Julie (1975) (Nagi Reddi-Chakrapani)
 Ganga Manga (1973)
 Ram Aur Shyam (1967)
 Maduve Madinodu (Kannada) (1965)(Nagi Reddi-Chakrapani)
 Gundamma Katha (1962)
 Manithan Maravillai (1962)
 Appu Chesi Pappu Koodu (1958)
 Maya Bazaar (1957)
 Missamma (1955)
 Chandraharam (1954)
 Pelli Chesi Choodu (1952)
 Patala Bhairavi (1951)
 Shavukaru (1950)

Director
 Sri Rajeswari Vilas Coffee Club (1976)
 Manithan Maravillai (1962)

Chandamama

Both Nagireddy and Aluri came up with the idea of a story book for kids and children, and thus Chandamama was born. The first edition of Chandamama was released in July, 1947. They made Chandamama popular not only in Telugu language but in ten other Indian languages. He started in 1934 the monthly publication of Yuva magazine from Chennai which was later shifted to Hyderabad. Well-known writer Kodavatiganti Kutumba Rao was a partner in this venture.
Kodavatiganti Kutumba Rao, a very close friend of aluri and a literary colossus in Telugu Literature, edited it for 28 years, till his death in August 1980.

Notes

External links
 http://www.thehindu.com/todays-paper/tp-features/tp-metroplus/the-story-in-a-road-name/article404360.ece

People from Tenali
1908 births
1975 deaths
Telugu film producers
Tamil film producers
Tamil film directors
Telugu screenwriters
20th-century Indian screenwriters